Gotarzes ( Gōtarz,  Gōtarzēs) was the name of two Parthian kings:
Gotarzes I c. 95–90 BC
Gotarzes II c. 40–51 AD